Il caso Pisciotta (The Pisciotta Case) is a 1972 Italian historical drama film written and directed by Eriprando Visconti. It is based on actual events involving Gaspare Pisciotta, lieutenant of the bandit Salvatore Giuliano, and his death by poisoning in jail in 1954.

Cast 

Tony Musante: Francesco Scauri 
Carla Gravina: Gemma
Salvo Randone: Don Ferdinando Cusimano
Saro Urzì: Don Vincenzo Coluzzi
Arturo Dominici: Michele Scauri
Mico Cundari: D'Eusebio 
Michele Placido: Amerigo Lo Jacono
Corrado Gaipa: direttore del carcere
Duilio Del Prete: Agent Sciurti
Nino Terzo: Rocco Minotti
Renato Pinciroli: Salvatore Pisciotta
Paolo Modugno: Gaspare Pisciotta
Vittorio Mezzogiorno: Agent Beretta
Antonio Casagrande: maresciallo 
Simonetta Stefanelli: Anna

References

External links

1972 films
Films directed by Eriprando Visconti
Italian historical drama films
1970s historical drama films
1972 drama films
1970s Italian films